The Battle of Chihuahua or Recapture of Chihuahua City took place on March 24, 1866, in Chihuahua City, in Chihuahua State, Mexico, between elements of the Mexican Army of the Republic, led by Colonel Luis Terrazas, and French and Mexican troops in the service of the Second Mexican Empire during the Second French intervention in Mexico. The attack on Chihuahua City was launched by the Republicans at 9am against the imperial occupying forces, resulting in an imperial surrender of the city two hours later.

References

Chihuahua (1866), Battle Of
1866 in Mexico
Chihuahua
March 1866 events